This is a list of casinos in New Jersey.

List of casinos

Current casinos

The Wild Wild West Casino was officially part of Bally's (1997-2020), now Caesars (2020-), and is a multi-purpose entertainment venue offering shopping, live entertainment, and sports betting, but not a casino.

Renamed casinos

Closed casinos

Canceled casinos

Online casinos

Gallery

See also

List of casinos in the United States 
List of casino hotels
Gambling in New Jersey

References

External links

New Jersey
Skyscrapers in Atlantic City, New Jersey
Casinos